Emmanuel Lutheran Church and Cemetery is a historic church located near  Ralph in Harding County, South Dakota. It was built in 1900 and was added to the National Register of Historic Places in 1987.

References

Lutheran churches in South Dakota
Churches on the National Register of Historic Places in South Dakota
Churches completed in 1900
Churches in Harding County, South Dakota
National Register of Historic Places in Harding County, South Dakota
Lutheran cemeteries in the United States